Claudio Camaso (born Claudio Volonté; 3 February 1939 – 16 September 1977) was an Italian actor, noted as much for his troubled, violent life as for his performances. He was the younger brother of Gian Maria Volonté.

Early life and career
Claudio Volonté was born in Turin in 1939, in the days leading up to the Second World War. His father, Mario, was a committed fascist who commanded a unit of the paramilitary Black Brigades (Brigate Nera) at Chivasso during the final months of the Italian Social Republic, while his mother Carolina (née Bianchi) was a scion of the Milanese haute bourgeoisie. In the aftermath of the war, Mario Volonté was sentenced to thirty years in prison upon being found guilty of aiding the military operations of the enemy "by ordering and participating in rounding up elements of the resistance movement in which many murders and robberies were committed". Although excluded from the general amnesty pronounced by the then justice minister, Palmiro Togliatti, he only served eight years of his sentence. His absence nevertheless led to a life of privations and hardships for the rest of the Volonté family. 

Following in the footsteps of his elder brother Gian Maria, Claudio decided to become an actor, and at some point in the early 1960s he adopted the pseudonym of Claudio Camaso. From 1964 to 1976 Camaso appeared in more than twenty films, again emulating his brother by starring in Spaghetti Westerns such as Antonio Margheriti's film Vengeance (1968). Latterly he reverted back to his real name, maintaining a career as a supporting actor by participating in Westerns, gialli movies and lurid, low-budget mondo productions, of which CIA Secret Story (Faccia di spia; 1975) – his last film, in which he played Che Guevara – is perhaps a prime example.

Controversies
Unlike his brother, who was noted for his attachment to radical left-wing causes, Camaso's youth was marked by clear neo-fascist sympathies. While still a minor he was acquitted on a charge of taking part in a demonstration that damaged property owned by the Italian Communist Party (PCI), and he was later accused of being involved in a bomb attack on another Communist Party building. In February 1965, Camaso was arrested while performing as an SS Officer in the controversial Rolf Hochhuth play The Deputy – a production that had already been subject to attempts by the authorities to close it down – and he was subsequently charged with planting a bomb that had damaged a side entrance to the Vatican City. The Baltimore Sun reported that the  police based their suspicions of Camaso on his past record and the fact that he sported a beard, which matched the description of one of the perpetrators given by an eyewitness; the newspaper also noted, however, that he had by this time apparently renounced his earlier extreme-right opinions and joined the Italian Socialist Party of Proletarian Unity (PSIUP). Maintaining that he should not be judged by "my old judiciary errors", Camaso denied the charge made against him, claiming that he was in the company of his girlfriend on the evening when the crime took place. Nine months on, in October, he was cleared by a magistrate on the grounds that he had "no case to answer".

Murder of Vincenzo Mazza and suicide
In August 1977 Camaso was arrested for stabbing a man to death in a street brawl. Hank Werba, Rome bureau chief for the film industry magazine Variety, reported the situation thus:

The Italian communist daily l'Unità further reported that the incident had occurred on 26 July, not August as the Variety article had suggested, and that Camaso's young daughter Saba had witnessed the attack.

On 16 September 1977, while in police custody, Camaso committed suicide by hanging himself in his cell in Regina Coeli prison.

Filmography

References

External links 
 

1939 births
1977 deaths
1977 suicides
Italian male film actors
Suicides by hanging in Italy
20th-century Italian male actors
People charged with murder
Italian people who died in prison custody
Prisoners who died in Italian detention
People who committed suicide in prison custody